Sangthang is the Himalayan peak in Kumaon Himalayas in Pithoragarh district of Uttarakhand state of India.

Location
It is situated in the easternmost part of Kumaun, lining Byans Valley. The peak is situated on Indo-Tibet border. The altitude of the peak is 6,480 m. This peak is near to Om Parvat and famous Himalayan passes of Mangshya Dhura and Sin La in the Kuthi Valley .

Ascent
The peak was climbed for the first time by P. Dasgupta in 1968.

See also
 Om Parvat
 Mount Kailash-Lake Manasarovar

References

Mountains of Uttarakhand
Geography of Pithoragarh district